Larstinden is a mountain in Lesja Municipality in Innlandet county, Norway.

See also
List of mountains of Norway

References

Lesja
Mountains of Innlandet